Nonoichi Station may refer to two railway stations in Nonoichi, Ishikawa, Japan:

 Nonoichi Station (Ishikawa), on the Ishikawa Line, operated by the Hokuriku Railroad
 Nonoichi Station (JR West), on the Hokuriku Main Line, operated by the West Japan Railway Company